The 2022–23 Northern Colorado Bears men's basketball team represented the University of Northern Colorado in the 2022–23 NCAA Division I men's basketball season. The Bears, led by third-year head coach Steve Smiley, played their home games at Bank of Colorado Arena in Greeley, Colorado as members of the Big Sky Conference.

Previous season
The Bears finished the 2021–22 season 22–16, 13–7 in Big Sky play to finish in a tie for third place. In the Big Sky tournament, they defeated Eastern Washington and Portland State, before falling to Montana State in the championship game. They received an invite to the CBI, where they defeated Florida Atlantic and UNC Asheville, before falling to UNC Wilmington in the semifinals.

Roster

Schedule and results

|-
!colspan=12 style=""| Non-conference regular season

|-
!colspan=12 style=""| Big Sky regular season

|-
!colspan=12 style=| 

Sources

References

Northern Colorado Bears men's basketball seasons
Northern Colorado Bears
Northern Colorado Bears men's basketball
Northern Colorado Bears men's basketball